Luis Páez may refer to:
Luis Pompilio Páez (born 1959), Colombian football defensive midfielder
Luis Páez (footballer, born 1986), Colombian football forward
Luis Páez (footballer, 1989-2019), Paraguayan football forward